Cristián Alejandro "Cimbi" Cuevas Jara (born 2 April 1995) is a Chilean professional footballer who plays for Universidad Católica. Cuevas plays primarily as a left-back but can also operate as a left-winger.

Cuevas played for the Chile national under-20 team and was selected to play in the South American Youth Championship. He competed in the FIFA U-20 World Cup in Turkey, helping Chile progress to the quarter-finals.

Club career

O'Higgins
Cuevas began his career at Primera División de Chile club O'Higgins. He progressed from the club's youth level all the way to the senior team. In 2011, he was promoted to the senior team, making his debut on 8 May in a 5–1 away loss to Colo-Colo at the Estadio Monumental. Cuevas has continued to appear since it, particularly in Copa Chile games.

In November 2012, it was reported that Cuevas had held a successful trial with Premier League club Chelsea following a number of impressive performances for the Chilean under-20 team.

In 2013, after a season at the reserve team, he was considered by Eduardo Berizzo to play the Torneo Transición, who chose him after a well South American Youth Football Championship in Argentina with the national under-20 side. He made seven appearances (the most of those as left back) and before the FIFA U-20 World Cup, on 23 July, Cuevas completed a five-year contract with Chelsea which will keep at Stamford Bridge until 2018. The transfer fee paid to O'Higgins was reported as £1.7 million.

Chelsea
After his successful move, Cuevas joined the club's pre-season and stayed training with the first adult team alongside other youngsters players under the orders of José Mourinho before being sent on season long loan to Dutch Eredivisie club Vitesse. There he linked up with fellow Chelsea loanees Patrick van Aanholt, Gaël Kakuta, Lucas Piazon, Tomáš Kalas, Sam Hutchinson and Christian Atsu.

Loan to Vitesse
On 1 September 2013, Cuevas made his first appearance on the bench in the match against AZ, although he was an unused substitution as Vitesse drew 1–1. On 1 September 2013, he again made an appearance on the bench in the match against PEC Zwolle, but remained unused.

Cuevas failed to make a single first team appearance before Vitesse decided to cancel his loan in February.

Loan to FC Eindhoven
On 7 February 2014, it was announced that Cuevas would spend the rest of the season on loan with FC Eindhoven in the Dutch Eerste Divisie. Later that day, he made his debut, coming off the bench and replacing Torino Hunte after the first half in a match against Almere City which ended in a 2–1 loss for Eindhoven. On 28 March, he scored his first goal for the club – and his first professional goal – in a 4–0 win over Sparta Rotterdam.

He finished the season with 13 appearances and one goal.

Loan to Universidad de Chile
On 30 June 2014, Cuevas was sent on a season long loan to Universidad de Chile. He made his debut on 13 February 2015 against Unión Española, which ended in a 2–1 loss for Universidad de Chile.

Cuevas made a total of six appearances with only four league appearances during his time back in his home country.

Loan to Sint-Truiden
On 10 August 2015, Cuevas was sent on a season-long loan to Belgian side Sint-Truiden along with fellow Chelsea youth player Joao Rodríguez. On 16 August 2015, he made his debut off the bench in the 62nd minute, replacing Yannis Mbombo in the match against Gent, a 1–0 defeat. On 21 November 2015, he scored his first goal for Sint-Truiden in their 2–1 away defeat against Waasland-Beveren, netting the opener of the fixture in the 9th minute.

On 31 August 2016, Cuevas returned to Sint-Truiden for another season-long loan.

Huachipato
On 1 July 2017, Cuevas agreed to return to Chile to join Primera División side Huachipato and a month later joined Dutch side Twente on a season-long loan. On 14 April 2018, he became the joint record holder for most yellow cards in a single Eredivisie season after getting his 12th yellow card of the season against ADO Den Haag.

Following an season at Twente, Cuevas joined Austria Wien in July 2018 on a season-long loan with an option to buy.

International career
Cuevas was part of the Chile under-20 team which participated in the 2013 South American Youth Championship in Argentina. He also joined the first team for the 2013 FIFA U-20 World Cup based in Turkey, where they reached the quarter-finals.

Cuevas was also included in Chile's squad for the 2015 South American Youth Football Championship, held in Uruguay.

Career statistics

Notes

References

External links
 Cristián Cuevas at Football-Lineups
 
 Voetbal International profile 
 

1995 births
Living people
People from Rancagua
Association football fullbacks
Association football wingers
Chilean footballers
Chile under-20 international footballers
Chile international footballers
Chilean expatriate footballers
Expatriate footballers in England
Expatriate footballers in the Netherlands
Expatriate footballers in Belgium
Expatriate footballers in Austria
Chilean Primera División players
Eredivisie players
Eerste Divisie players
Belgian Pro League players
Austrian Football Bundesliga players
O'Higgins F.C. footballers
Chelsea F.C. players
SBV Vitesse players
FC Eindhoven players
Universidad de Chile footballers
Sint-Truidense V.V. players
C.D. Huachipato footballers
FC Twente players
FK Austria Wien players
Club Deportivo Universidad Católica footballers
2015 South American Youth Football Championship players
Chilean expatriate sportspeople in Belgium
Chilean expatriate sportspeople in England
Chilean expatriate sportspeople in the Netherlands
Chilean expatriate sportspeople in Austria